Mil Qader may refer to:
 Mil Qader-e Olya
 Mil Qader-e Sofla